Men's ice hockey tournaments have been staged at the Olympic Games since 1920; after its introduction at the 1920 Summer Olympics, it was permanently added to the Winter Olympic Games in 1924. Switzerland has participated in 16 of 23 tournaments, sending 27 goaltenders and 187 skaters.

The Olympic Games were originally intended for amateur athletes, so the players of the National Hockey League (NHL) and other professional leagues were not allowed to compete. Many of Canada's top players were professional, so the Canadian Amateur Hockey Association (CAHA) pushed for the ability to use professional and amateur players. The International Olympic Committee (IOC) refused, and Canada withdrew from the 1972 and 1976 Olympics in protest.  In 1986, the IOC voted to allow all athletes to compete in Olympic Games, starting in 1988. The NHL did not allow its players to participate in 1988, 1992 or 1994, because doing so would force the league to halt play during the Olympics. An agreement was reached in 1995 that allowed NHL players to compete in the Olympics, starting with the 1998 Games in Nagano, Japan. The Swiss national team is co-ordinated by the Swiss Ice Hockey Association and players are chosen by the team's management staff.

Switzerland has won two bronze medals in men's ice hockey, in the 1928 Games and 1948 Games; Bibi Torriani is the only player who won medals with both teams.  Four players have been inducted into the International Ice Hockey Hall of Fame – Torriani, brothers Ferdinand Cattini and Hans Cattini, and Jakob Kölliker. Three players – Martin Plüss, Mathias Seger, and Mark Streit – have played in four tournaments; Streit was captain for the first three of his appearances. Plüss, Seger, and Streit all have played in 19 games, the most of any Swiss player. Ulrich Poltera holds the record for most goals (21) and most total points (24), while five players have six assists each.

Key

Goaltenders

Reserve goaltenders
These goaltenders were named to the Olympic roster, but did not receive any ice time during games.

Skaters

See also
 Switzerland men's national ice hockey team

Notes

References

External links
 Swiss Ice Hockey Association - Official website

ice hockey
Switzerland
Switzerland

Switzerland men's national ice hockey team